The River Deer is river in Devon, a tributary of the River Tamar, joining it at North Tamerton.

Toponymy
The root of the name is uncertain, since no early forms have been found (in 1929 to 1931 Deer is used in Moore's History of Devonshire).  A suggested back-formation is from Derriton, perhaps supported by aqua de Dyraton from 1282 in the Assize Rolls.

References

Deer
Tamar catchment